The Hon. Arthur Gascoigne Douglas D.C.L. (5 January 1827– 19 July 1905) was Bishop of Aberdeen and Orkney in Scotland from 1883 to 1905.

Biography
Douglas studied for his licentiate in theology at Durham University, completing his final examinations in Easter term 1850. He was a member of Hatfield College. He served as a priest in Kidderminster, Southwark, Scaldwell and Shawick before he was elected Bishop of Aberdeen in 1883.

He was the fifth son of George Sholto Douglas, 17th earl of Morton. He married, 17 April 1855, Anna Maria Harriet, youngest daughter of Richards Richards of Caerynch, co. Merioneth. By her, he had 3 sons and 6 daughters. He was a participant in the consecration of St Mary's Church, Dalmahoy in 1850, where he was subsequently buried in 1905.

References

1827 births
1905 deaths
Bishops of Aberdeen and Orkney
Alumni of Hatfield College, Durham